The Trenčín Region is one of the eight Slovak administrative regions. It consists of 9 districts (okresy). The region was established in 1996: previously it had been a part of the West Slovak Region and partly the Central Slovak Region. Industry is a major sector of the region's economy.

Geography
It is located in the north-western Slovakia, has an area of 4,502 km² and a population of 600,386 (2005). The Danubian Lowland reaches the region to Nové Mesto nad Váhom and Partizánske areas. There are several mountain ranges in the region: a small part of the Little Carpathians in the south-west, White Carpathians in the north-west, Maple Mountains in the north, Strážov Mountains in the centre, Považský Inovec in the south, Vtáčnik in the south-east and Žiar in the east. Small parts of Lesser Fatra and of the Kremnica Mountains also stretch to the region. Major rivers are the Váh in the western part of the region, creating so-called Váh Basin and Nitra in the south-east and east, creating the Upper Nitra Basin. The Myjava River springs in the west, but flows into the Trnava Region. The region borders Žilina Region in the north-east and east, Banská Bystrica Region in the south-east, Nitra Region in the south, Trnava Region in the south and south-west, Czech South Moravian Region in the west and the Zlín Region in the north-west and north.

Demographics
The largest towns are Trenčín, Prievidza, Považská Bystrica, Dubnica nad Váhom and Partizánske. According to the 2001 census, the region had 605,583 inhabitants, with Slovaks forming a relatively homogeneous majority (97.3%), with a small minority of Czechs (1%) and others.

Politics
Current governor of Trenčín region is Jaroslav Baška (Smer-SD). He won with 67.25 %. In election 2022 was elected also regional parliament :

2017 elections

Administrative division
The Trenčín Region consists of 9 districts: Bánovce nad Bebravou, Ilava, Myjava, Nové Mesto nad Váhom, Partizánske, Považská Bystrica, Prievidza, Púchov, and Trenčín.

There are 275 municipalities (obce), including 18 towns, where about 58% of the region's population live.

Sport

Slovak bandy has its base in the region. Trenčianske Teplice is the seat of Slovak Bandy Association and rink bandy sessions have been organised in for example Púchov and Nové Mesto nad Váhom.

See also
Trencsén County of the Kingdom of Hungary

References

External links
 Official website of the region
 Official website of the regional metropolis

 
Regions of Slovakia